A mare is a female horse.

Mare is the Latin word for "sea".

Mare may also refer to:

People
Surname
Mare (surname)
Walter de la Mare (1873–1956), English poet and writer
Given name
Mare Kandre (1962–2005), Swedish writer of Estonian origin
Mare Tommingas (born 1959), Estonian ballet dancer and choreographer
Mare Teichmann (born 1954), Estonian psychologist and academic
Mare Vint (1942–2020), Estonian graphic artist
Mare Winningham (born 1959), American actress and singer

Places
 Maré, a commune in the Loyalty Islands of New Caledonia
 Maré Island, the second-largest of the Loyalty Islands
 Maire, Netherlands, also known as Mare, former village in Zeeland, Netherlands
 Märe, a mountain in the Bernese Alps in Switzerland
 Maré, Rio de Janeiro, a favela in Rio, Brazil
 Weston-super-Mare, a town in North Somerset, England
 Mare', a town in Syria

In Romania
 Baia Mare, a municipality in Romania
 Sânnicolau Mare, town in Timiș County, Romania
 Satu Mare County, is a county (judeţ) in Romania
 Vânju Mare, a town in Mehedinţi County, Romania
 Târnava Mare River, a river in Romania
 Someşul Mare River, a river in Romania

Geography
 Mare Nostrum, another name for the Mediterranean Sea
 Kraken Mare, a large body of liquid on Saturn's moon Titan
 Lunar mare, a basaltic plain on Earth's moon

Music
 Mare (band), an experimental band on Hydra Head Records
"Mare" (Diamá Song), 2014
 "Mare", a song by Black Eyed Peas from the album The E.N.D.

Other uses
 Mare (folklore), a goblin of Germanic folklore
 Mare's Leg, or Mare's Laig, a pistol first used in the fictional television series Wanted: Dead or Alive
 Mare (TV series), Japanese television drama
 Mare Sheehan (Kate Winslet), fictional main character in HBO crime drama Mare of Easttown
 Mayor Mare (Cathy Weseluck), fictional character in the series My Little Pony: Friendship is Magic

See also
 Mares (disambiguation)
 Mare Island (disambiguation)
 Satu Mare (disambiguation)
 Valea Mare (disambiguation)
 Mayor, a head of a town, district, city, etc.

Estonian feminine given names